The Korean International School of Hong Kong is an international school located in Lei King Wan, Sai Wan Ho, Hong Kong. It is located near the Tai Koo Shing area, which is home to a large number of Hong Kong's Korean families. It was founded in 1994.

School structure and curriculum
The Korean International School is divided into two sections based on medium of instruction: the Korean section teaches in Korean, while the international section teaches in English. The school's chief operating officer is Byun Chang Suk. Each section has its own principal; Christopher Chadwick is the principal of the English section. It is one of the few overseas Korean educational institutions which also accepts non-Korean students. As of 2013, it enrolled 560 students. Roughly 5% of its ₩4 billion operating budget is subsidized by the South Korean government. Of the Korean students, who make up roughly 70% of the student body, 65% are the children of permanent residents.

The School follows the British National Curriculum as authorized by Cambridge International Examinations (CIE). It is a certified member of CIE's Primary Programme, with access to the wealth of support resources produced by CIE. The English Second Language Programme also follows CIE's programs of study with students sitting external exams offered at the British Council.

History

Early growth
The origin was a Saturday school established in 1960; it initially had 6 students.

Discussions about the need for an international school to serve Koreans in Hong Kong began as early as the 1980s, and the Korean International School finally began operating in 1994, with both a Korean section and an English section. Roughly half of the HK$70 million costs of constructing the campus was funded by the South Korean government, with the rest funded by donations from the local Korean community. In the first year, the Korean section enrolled 140 students, while the English section enrolled 120. In 1996, they became the first international school in Hong Kong to introduce a special education program for developmentally delayed children; normally in Hong Kong, separate schools are set up to offer such programs, but KIS chose to establish a small special education class within the school, consisting of roughly 10 students, because of the demand for it among the community. The English section of their middle school division began full operation in August 1997 with the establishment of the 9th grade. Early on in its history, the school experienced rapid growth; however, this was disrupted by the economic aftershocks of the 1997 Asian Financial Crisis, during which student numbers dropped from 250 to 190.

Staff layoffs and bribery investigation
In June 2006, the Korean International School's managing organisation, the Korean Residents' Association, was investigated by the Independent Commission Against Corruption; their office was searched, and one staff member was charged with having received HK$100,000 in bribes related to the renegotiation of a real estate management company's contract and sentenced to eight months' imprisonment. Local Koreans felt shaken by the investigations and expressed their loss of confidence, some committed suicide in the managing organisation as a result. Back in 2004, KIS terminated 26 staff in what they described as a "drastic restructuring" of their curriculum. Then-principal Steven Kim says the teachers were not fired but instead laid off with four months notice; the teachers in question disputed this, claiming instead that they had not been told of the decision until late in the year. Parents in the Korean community were unhappy with the sudden changes and chose to transfer their children to other schools as a result. They expressed frustration that they were not consulted regarding a matter involving so many staff; of particular concern to them was the removal of Doug Anderson, former head of the school's English section. Anderson was sent on "extended home leave" and replaced by Taras Kozyra.

2016 corruption scandal

In December 2016, The Korean International School of Hong Kong was discovered to have embezzled South Korean government subsidies, amendment of articles of incorporation, and appropriation of certain funding by board members. This highlighted a lack of transparency among school leadership, with the Chairman, board members and some employees using embezzled money for their own personal use instead of educational purposes. Eventually, those involved were subjected to disciplinary actions.

See also
 Koreans in Hong Kong
 Consulate General of South Korea in Hong Kong

References

External links

School Website
Bailey, M.R. "Discussion on Learning English" - An article by an English teacher at the school published in Wednesday Journal (a newspaper for Koreans in Hong Kong)

International schools in Hong Kong
Primary schools in Hong Kong
Secondary schools in Hong Kong
Korean international schools in China
Korean international schools in Asia
1994 establishments in Hong Kong
Educational institutions established in 1994
Sai Wan Ho
Hong Kong–South Korea relations